Muhammad Karim Khan Agha, commonly known as KK Agha, is a British Pakistani jurist and lawyer who is currently serving as the Justice of the Sindh High Court since 2015.

Previously, he has served as the United Nations Prosecutor in the Netherlands and Africa and also as the advocate of the Supreme Court of Pakistan. He has also served as the Additional Attorney General, appointed by then Prime Minister of Pakistan, Yusuf Raza Gilani, between 2010 and 2011. Later, he was made NAB Prosecutor General.

He is known for his affiliation to Bhutto-Zardari family and was their lawyer when corruption cases were referenced against Benazir Bhutto and Asif Ali Zardari.

Agha holds a citizenship of the United Kingdom (UK). He holds properties in the UK for which a reference was filed against him by the Supreme Judicial Council.

References

20th-century Pakistani lawyers
Judges of the Sindh High Court
21st-century Pakistani lawyers
Pakistani emigrants to the United Kingdom
Naturalised citizens of the United Kingdom
Year of birth missing (living people)
Living people
British lawyers of Pakistani descent